Dovhan, Dovgan, Dolgan, Douhan, Dołhan or Dowhan, is a surname. Notable people with the surname include:

 Alena Douhan, Belarusian United Nations special rapporteur
 Iryna Dovhan (born 1962), Ukrainian hostage survivor
  (born 1964), Polish badminton player
 Mihai Dolgan (1942–2008), Moldovan musician
 Mihail Dolgan (1939–2013), Moldovan writer
 Mykola Dovhan (born 1955), Ukrainian rower
 Robert Dowhan (born 1967), Polish politician
 Stefania Dovhan, Ukrainian-American soprano
 Viktor Dovgan (born 1987), Russian ice hockey player

See also
 L-vocalization, Kovtun
 
 
 

Ukrainian-language surnames